Minae of Silla (c. 817–839) (r. 838–839) was the 44th ruler of the Korean kingdom of Silla.  He was a great-grandson of King Wonseong, and the son of Daeachan Kim Chung-gong.  His mother was a Kim, Lady Gwibo.  He married the daughter of Gakgan Kim Yeong-gong.

Being of true bone rank, Minae rose to the rank of sangdaedeung.  He then schemed with Kim Rihong and others to overthrow King Huigang.  They threatened the King and drove him to kill himself.  However, in the following year, Kim Ujing allied himself with Jang Bogo, who sent his forces into the capital (Gyeongju) to topple and slay the king.  Minae died at the soldiers' hands in the twelfth lunar month, early in 839.

Family 
Parents
Father: Kim Chung-gong (김충공)
Grandfather: Prince Hyechung (혜충태자) (750–791/792)
Grandmother:  Queen Seongmok, of the Kim clan ( 성목태후 김씨)
Mother: Lady Gwibo (귀보부인 김씨), of the Kim clan 
Consorts and their respective issue: 
Queen Yunyong, of the Kim clan (윤용왕후 김씨)

See also
List of Korean monarchs
List of Silla people
Unified Silla

References

Silla rulers
839 deaths
810s births
9th-century Korean monarchs